William Loudon Wardrope (9 September 1874 – 1911) was a Scottish footballer who played in the Football League for Middlesbrough and Newcastle United, mainly as an outside left.

Career
Wishaw-born winger Wardrope began his football career at Dalziel Rovers, being selected for Scotland at Junior level before playing for Scottish League Motherwell as an amateur in 1893, and Linthouse in 1894. In August 1895 he joined Football League Second Division side Newcastle United, making his Football League debut and scoring against Loughbrough in September of that year, in a 3–0 win at St James’ Park. He finished the season as both an ever-present and as Newcastle's top scorer, scoring 20 goals in 36 games including a hat-trick against Darwen in November. Wardrope scored a further 14 goals in the 1897–98 campaign as Newcastle won promotion to the First Division for the first time in their history as Second Division runners-up, qualifying by beating Stoke and Blackburn Rovers in two-legged 'test matches'. He spent two further seasons with the Toon in the top flight before joining Middlesbrough in April 1900 after 51 goals in 145 appearances for the Magpies.

Wardrope had two full seasons at Boro, helping them win promotion to the First Division in 1901–02, scoring 10 goals as they finished Second Division runners-up. But at the end of the season, having scored 24 goals in 73 appearances, he returned to Scotland and joined Third Lanark, winning the Scottish Football League championship in 1903–04 plus two Glasgow Cups; while with the Warriors he was selected to represent the Scottish League team in a 1–0 defeat to the Irish League at Grosvenor Park, Belfast in February 1903.

After two seasons at Cathkin Park he then joined Southern League club Fulham in 1904, scoring 32 goals in 68 appearances for the Cottagers and helping them to win the Southern League championship in 1905–06. He transferred to Swindon Town in the 1906 close season and scored nine times for the Robins in 39 appearances, before returning to Scotland again to join Hamilton Academical in 1907, subsequently joining Raith Rovers in 1908 before his eventual retirement. He emigrated to the United States in 1910, but within a year had died from cholera.

Career statistics
Source:

References

1873 births
1911 deaths
Scottish footballers
English Football League players
Association football outside forwards
Dalziel Rovers F.C. players
Motherwell F.C. players
Linthouse F.C. players
Newcastle United F.C. players
Middlesbrough F.C. players
Third Lanark A.C. players
Fulham F.C. players
Swindon Town F.C. players
Hamilton Academical F.C. players
Raith Rovers F.C. players
Sportspeople from Wishaw
Scottish emigrants to the United States
Scottish Junior Football Association players
Scotland junior international footballers
Deaths from cholera
Scottish Football League players
Scottish Football League representative players
Southern Football League players
Footballers from North Lanarkshire